Saint Mark's Coptic Orthodox Cathedral  is a Coptic Orthodox church in Azbakeya, Cairo. It was the seat of the Coptic Pope from 1800 to 1971.

Due to Ibrahim El-Gohary's  influential position in the government and his great favor to the Muslim rulers, he was able to issue fatwas that permitted the Copts to rebuild the destroyed churches and monasteries.

This was of particular importance because the Copts were not allowed to build new churches or to repair old ones unless they got official government approval, which was rarely granted.

One of these churches that he built is Saint Mark's Coptic Orthodox Cathedral in Azbakeya in Cairo, that his brother completed and inaugurated by Pope Mark VIII in 1800.

Ibrahim El-Gohary also donated many endowment of good land and money for the reconstruction, that amounted to 238 endowments as documented in the Coptic Orthodox Patriarchate.

The cathedral served as the Seat of the Coptic Orthodox Pope of Alexandria between 1800 and 1971, after which it moved to Saint Mark's Coptic Orthodox Cathedral in the Abbassia district.

References

Coptic Orthodox churches in Cairo
Cathedrals in Cairo
Coptic architecture
18th-century Oriental Orthodox church buildings
Oriental Orthodox cathedrals in Egypt
18th-century establishments in Africa
Establishments in Ottoman Egypt
18th-century churches in Egypt